Keith Pearce (June 11, 1929 – February 28, 1997) was a Canadian football player who played for the Winnipeg Blue Bombers. He previously played for the Winnipeg Rods.

References

1929 births
1997 deaths
Players of Canadian football from Manitoba
Canadian football people from Winnipeg
Winnipeg Blue Bombers players